Budeasa is a commune in Argeș County, Muntenia, Romania. It is composed of six villages: Budeasa Mare (the commune centre), Budeasa Mică, Calotești, Gălășești, Rogojina and Valea Mărului.

Famous natives and citizens of Budeasa
 :ro:Alexandru Mirodan (1927–2010), Romanian writer
 :ro:Nicu Vladimir (1950–1995), Romanian Singer (Drumuri de roua)

References

Communes in Argeș County
Localities in Muntenia